Waitangirua is a suburb of Porirua City approximately 22km north of Wellington in New Zealand.

Waitangirua was established during the 1960s, almost exclusively as a Government housing development for New Zealand's burgeoning working class immigrant population.  As such the ethnic demographic of Waitangirua at the time of establishment comprising primarily Pacific Island, Scottish, Indian, Irish, English and Chinese as well as Māori.  Many of the original settling families still live in Waitangirua today.

The hilly suburb until the late 90s was almost semi-rural surrounded by farmland with Whitby to the North East, Pauatahanui Inlet and Estuary further to the North, and the Belmont hills and Hutt Valley to the East.

The diverse multi-racial nature of Waitangirua makes for a colourful community dominated by a vibrant and exuberant youth culture.

Several scenes from the Taika Waititi film Eagle vs Shark were shot on location in Waitangirua.

Demographics

Waitangirua had a population of 4,398 at the 2018 New Zealand census, an increase of 378 people (9.4%) since the 2013 census, and an increase of 327 people (8.0%) since the 2006 census. There were 1,044 households. There were 2,097 males and 2,301 females, giving a sex ratio of 0.91 males per female. The median age was 26.4 years (compared with 37.4 years nationally), with 1,323 people (30.1%) aged under 15 years, 1,128 (25.6%) aged 15 to 29, 1,599 (36.4%) aged 30 to 64, and 345 (7.8%) aged 65 or older.

Ethnicities were 22.0% European/Pākehā, 28.8% Māori, 66.0% Pacific peoples, 8.3% Asian, and 1.9% other ethnicities (totals add to more than 100% since people could identify with multiple ethnicities).

The proportion of people born overseas was 29.9%, compared with 27.1% nationally.

Although some people objected to giving their religion, 23.7% had no religion, 62.2% were Christian, 0.7% were Hindu, 1.8% were Muslim, 1.2% were Buddhist and 2.9% had other religions.

Of those at least 15 years old, 219 (7.1%) people had a bachelor or higher degree, and 843 (27.4%) people had no formal qualifications. The median income was $19,400, compared with $31,800 nationally. The employment status of those at least 15 was that 1,230 (40.0%) people were employed full-time, 390 (12.7%) were part-time, and 297 (9.7%) were unemployed.

Education

References

External links 
Waitangirua Community Profile at Statistics NZ

Suburbs of Porirua